"Breeze On By" is a smooth jazz pop song co-written and performed by Donny Osmond, influenced by George Benson's '70s hit "Breezin'". It is from the December 2004 Donny Osmond album What I Meant to Say. The single reached #37 in Billboard Adult Contemporary chart in 2005 and #8 on the UK singles chart in October 2004 - Osmond's first British Top Ten hit in thirty years.

Lyrical songwriters include Donny Osmond, Eliot Kennedy, Gary Barlow, and Bobby Womack.

References

2005 singles
Donny Osmond songs
Songs written by Gary Barlow
Songs written by Bobby Womack
Songs written by Eliot Kennedy